Swaying may refer to any other regular sideways movement such as:
 Schunkeln 
 The movement of trees in the wind 
 The kinematic envelope of trains at speed